End Of A Long Hard Day was released by folk music duo The Gordons in 1997 on Reception Records. It was produced by Gary Gordon and Curtis Jay Hiner, with executive producer Kevin Graham. It was recorded at Noteworthy Studio in Carbondale, Illinois, engineered by Todd Freeman, and mixed at Mainframe Studio in Nashville, Tennessee by The Gordons. It was mastered at Chelsea in Brentwood, Tennessee.

Track listing
"Sawdust" (Noah Gordon, Louise Parker) - 2:36 
"Johnny Bring The Jug Around The Hill" (public domain) - 2:44
"Thy Burdens Are Greater Than Mine" (Pee Wee King, Redd Stewart) - 2:52
"Kentucky In The Morning" (Tom T. Hall) - 2:58
"End Of A Long Hard Day" (Gretchen Peters) - 2:29
"The Old School" (G. Gordon) - 4:20
"I Woke Up With Tears In My Eyes" (Damon Black) - 3:02 
"Little Country Church In The Pines" (Curtis J. Hiner, R. Gordon) - 2:31 
"Big Tilda" (Ralph Stanley) - 2:14
"Susannah" (G. Peters) - 3:32 
"High Ballin'" (Curtis J. Hiner) - 2:40
"Thank You Lord" (G. Gordon) - 1:22

Personnel

The Gordons
Gary Gordon – vocals, guitar
Roberta Gordon – vocals, autoharp

Additional personnel
Noah Gordon - vocals
Katsuyaki Miyazaki - mandolin
Mark Stoffel - mandolin
Curtis Jay Hiner - stand-up bass
Bill Cross - banjo
David Johnson - fiddle

1997 albums
The Gordons (duo) albums